Jouko Innanen (29 October 1952 – 1 October 2019) was a Finnish cartoonist, caricaturist and comics artist. Innanen's cartoons were published in the magazines Iltalehti, Turun Sanomat, Länsi-Savo, Itä-Savo and Länsiväylä. He died in Savonlinna.

Bibliography
Till . Espoo: Western Fairway , 1986.  
Suominen Molli . Helsingfors: Ottawa, 1992.  
Herr Kaaranen . Helsingfors: Automediat, 2010.

References

External links
 Lambiek Comiclopedia article.

1952 births
2019 deaths
Finnish caricaturists
Finnish cartoonists
Finnish comics artists